Raney House may refer to:

Raney House (Rogers, Arkansas), listed on the National Register of Historic Places listings in Benton County, Arkansas 
David G. Raney House, Apalachicola, Florida, listed on the National Register of Historic Places in Florida

See also
Rainey House (disambiguation)